Miss India Worldwide 1992 was the third edition of the international female pageant. Total number of contestants were not known. Icha Singh  of United States crowned as winner at the end of the event.

Delegates

 – Komal Sahni
 – Manjul Baharie
 – Icha Singh

External links
http://www.worldwidepageants.com/

References

1992 beauty pageants